Charles Hartley may refer to:

 Charles Augustus Hartley (1825–1915), British engineer 
 Charles Hartley (educationist) (1865–1935), British educationist
 Charlie Hartley (Lancashire cricketer) (1873–1927), American-born English cricketer
 Charlie Hartley (Kent cricketer) (born 1994), English cricketer

See also 
 Hartley (disambiguation)